Omaha School District can refer to:
 Omaha Public Schools (Omaha, Nebraska)
 Omaha School District (Omaha, Arkansas)